Sataspes scotti is a species of moth of the family Sphingidae. It is known from north-western India.

References

Sataspes (moth)
Moths described in 1926